In broadcast facilities and television studios, a central apparatus room (CAR, pronounced "C-A-R"),  central machine room, or central equipment room (CER), or central technical area (CTA), or rack room is where shared equipment common to all technical areas is located.  Some broadcast facilities have several of these rooms. It should be air-conditioned, however low-noise specifications such as acoustical treatments are optional. Equipment is connected either directly with an attached foldout monitor, keyboard and mouse or remotely via KVM switch, SSH, VNC, RS-232 or remote desktop.

Equipment

These rooms contain broadcast and broadcast IT mission critical gear necessary to broadcast and television operations. CARs usually house audio routers, video routers, video servers, compressors and multiplexers that utilize broadcast automation systems with broadcast programming applications to playout television programs.

They contain broadcast and monitoring equipment, through which all the operations are monitored by the transmission engineer, without disturbing the studio recordings. CER may also house analog and digital TV transmission systems, satellite up-link systems, digital processing synchronizers, video patch panels, and audio patch panels, including video monitors.

Common equipment 

 19-inch racks
 Antenna tracking system
 Audio router
 Broadcast delay
 Camera control units (CCUs)
 Conditional access system
 Character generator subtitling systems
 Distribution frame
 Digital TV encoder
 Fiber optic transceiver
 Frame synchronizers
 GPS receivers
 High-power amplifiers for transmission (television transmitter)
 Integrated receiver/decoder (IRD)
 IF distribution.
 Media storage
 Multiplexer
 Network switch
 Audio monitoring tools
 Radio frequency devices
 Router
 Serial digital interface (SDI) audio de-embedder
 Talkback (recording)
 Transport stream analyzer
 VTRs and/or VCRs (formerly, replaced with video servers)
 Video router
 Video server (also called playout server)
Video switcher frame or main unit
 video monitoring tools
 Video monitor
 Vectorscope
 Waveform monitor

See also
 Broadcast engineering
 Data center
 Master control room (MCR)
 Network operations center (NOC)
 Production control room (PCR)
 Server room
 Server farm
 Transmission control room (TCR)

References 

Broadcasting
Broadcast engineering
Rooms
Television terminology